Bert Green may refer to:

Bert Green (physicist), Herbert S. Green
Bert Green (rugby league), Albert Green (rugby league)

See also
Hubert Green (1946–2018), golfer
Bert Greene (disambiguation)
Albert Green (disambiguation)
Robert Green (disambiguation)
Herbert Green (disambiguation)
Bertie Green (disambiguation)